Hedysarum hedysaroides, common name alpine sainfoin,  is a perennial herb belonging to the family Fabaceae.

Description
It is a perennial plant, with straight or ascending stems and imparipinnate leaves, 1–3 cm long. Inflorescences bear from 15 to 30-35 purple-violet flowers in clusters. The flowering period extends from June to August.

Distribution
This species can be found in Central and Southern Europe, in Finland, Russia, Ukraine and Western North America.

Bibliography
 Pignatti S. - Flora d'Italia (3 voll.) - Edagricole - 1982
 Tutin, T.G. et al. - Flora Europaea, second edition - 1993
 Zangheri P. - Flora Italica (2 voll.) - Cedam - 1976

References

Hedysareae
Plants described in 1753
Taxa named by Carl Linnaeus